Man Overboard may refer to:
 Man overboard, an emergency in which a person has fallen off a boat or ship into the water

Games 
 Man overboard (dominoes), situation in dominoes when a player has no matching tiles and is forced to draw from the boneyard

Literature 
 Man Overboard!, a 1936 novel by Freeman Wills Crofts
 Man Overboard, a nonfiction book by Jose Dalisay Jr.
 Man Overboard (book), a 1995 nonfiction book by Burl Barer
 Man Overboard, a novel by Monica Dickens
 Man Overboard!, a novel by Francis Marion Crawford 1903

Film and TV
 Man Overboard (film), a 1921 German film directed by Karl Grune
 "Man Overboard" (Yes, Prime Minister), a 1987 episode of Yes, Prime Minister

Music 
 Man Overboard (band), an American pop punk band
Albums
 Man Overboard (Man Overboard album), 2011
 Man Overboard (Bob Welch album), 1980
 Man Overboard (Buck 65 album), 2001
 Man Overboard, an album by Ian Hunter
Songs
 "Man Overboard" (Blink-182 song)
 "Man Overboard" (Do-Re-Mi song), 1985
 "Man Overboard", a song by Blondie from Blondie
 "Man Overboard", a song by The Caretaker Race
 "Man Overboard", a song by Eric Clapton from Money and Cigarettes
 "Man Overboard", a song by Polytechnic from Down til Dawn
 "Man Overboard", a song by Status Quo from Perfect Remedy
 "Man Overboard", a song by Puscifer from Conditions of My Parole
 "Man Overboard", a song by Far from Water & Solutions